Sydney Charles Puddefoot (17 October 1894 – 2 October 1972) was an English footballer who played for West Ham United, Falkirk and Blackburn Rovers. He played mainly as a centre forward or inside right. He was also a cricketer for Essex. He went on to coach at Fenerbahçe, and manage Galatasaray and Northampton Town.

Club career

Early years and West Ham United
Puddefoot was born in Limehouse in the East End of London. He was a pupil at Park School in West Ham and played junior football with Condor Athletic and Limehouse Town before being spotted by West Ham United in a London Juniors match against Surrey Juniors. He initially joined the Hammers as an amateur but signed on as a professional before the start of the 1913–14 season. Under the tutelage of coach and future manager Charlie Paynter, he quickly developed into a formidable force and scored 28 goals in 55 Southern League appearances for the club. He broke the club record for most individual goals scored in an FA Cup match, landing five (including a hat-trick in seven minutes) in an 8–1 mauling of Chesterfield in a first-round game on 10 January 1914. The record remains to this day and is also West Ham's biggest victory in the competition.

Wartime
Puddefoot worked at a munitions factory for most of World War I and was not called up for service until late on in the conflict. He made 126 appearances in the wartime London Combination and scored nearly 100 goals, including seven against Crystal Palace in April 1918 (a record for the competition). On 8 September 1917, he played against QPR in their first game at Loftus Road, scoring a hat-trick.

During his service, he was stationed at Bridge of Allan in Stirlingshire and guested for Falkirk during his time in Scotland.

After the war and Falkirk
After the end of the war, Puddefoot played in the newly enlarged Football League Division Two for the 1919–20 season. He scored 21 goals for West Ham that season, and was selected to play for England in three Victory International games (he scored in all three). He then scored 29 goals in the 1920–21 season and 14 in 1921–22.

Puddefoot's exploits made him much sought after and Falkirk, who had witnessed the player first-hand, won the battle for his transfer on 7 February 1922. The fee of £5,000 was a world football transfer record, and represented the only time a Scottish team has broken the record. So eager were the Falkirk supporters to land their man that they themselves set up a public fund to raise money for the purchase. Puddefoot himself earned a £390 fee for agreeing the transfer. His younger brother Len followed him to Falkirk at the start of the following season for a month's trial, but only made a single appearance.

The record would last less than a month, however, as Warney Cresswell was transferred from South Shields to Sunderland for £5,500 on 3 March 1922.

Puddefoot spent three seasons at Brockville Park, scoring 45 goals in 113 league appearances.

Blackburn Rovers
Puddefoot joined Blackburn Rovers on 3 February 1925 for £4,000, making his debut at Arsenal on 7 February 1925. He won the FA Cup with Blackburn in 1928. He set up the opening goal in the first minute of the match when he shoulder-charged Billy Mercer, the goalkeeper of opponents Huddersfield Town, with Jack Roscamp following-up to score.

In 1929, Puddefoot was among the first to take advantage of the new FA rule that allowed for personal hearings for disciplinary matters, after his sending off against Bolton Wanderers.

He left Blackburn, having scored 87 goals in 267 appearances in all competitions.

Return to West Ham United
On 26 February 1932, ten years after leaving his boyhood club, and at the age of 37, Syd returned to east London to help with the ultimately doomed effort to avoid relegation in the 1931–32 season. He made seven appearances that season without return, and managed three goals in 15 appearances the following season. He played his 192nd and final game for West Ham on 6 March 1933, scoring the last of his 107 goals for the club.

International career
Puddefoot's three Victory International games did not count as official appearances. He did, however, gain official caps when he played twice for England in the British Home Championship, once in 1925 and once in 1926.

Cricket career
Puddefoot played cricket for Essex and had shown promise before leaving for Scotland. He appeared in eight first-class matches in 1922 and 1923, travelling back to Essex during summers while he was with Falkirk.

Coaching career
After the end of his playing career, Puddefoot travelled to Turkey to coach at Fenerbahçe, where he teamed up with József Schweng, the club's first foreign manager. He saw early success with the club, winning the 1932–33 Istanbul Football League championship. However, he had a poor relationship with the Hungarian manager and he moved to Istanbul rivals Galatasaray for the 1933–34 season.

In February 1934, he was involved in an incident in which he was manhandled while trying to calm down players during a game. Play had to be suspended and police were called in when the crowd invaded the pitch. As a result, 17 of the 22 players who were involved in the match were suspended by the Turkish Football Association.

Puddefoot returned to England in 1934 for the birth of his child. He played twice for St. Annes FC of the Ribblesdale League in June 1934. He worked as an FA instructor to Kent Secondary Schoolboys, replacing Wally Hardinge in the role in 1935, but left to take on the managers role at Northampton Town. He joined the East Midlands club on 8 March 1935 and stayed for two years, resigning on 10 March 1937 after a disagreement over club policy. He left the club having won 41 of his 94 games in charge.

During World War II, he worked as a War Reserve Constable for the Blackpool Borough Police and went on to become a civil servant with the Ministry of Pensions. He joined Southend United as a scout in 1967.

Personal life
He died in October 1972 after a three-week battle against pneumonia, just before what would have been his 78th birthday. He was survived by his wife, Lillian (née Frankland), and daughter, Susanne Puddefoot (1934–2010), a journalist who edited the Times Women's Page in the 1960s.

Career statistics

Managerial statistics

Notes

References

External links
 Sydney (Syd) Puddefoot at Spartacus Educational
 Sydney Puddefoot at 11v11
 Syd Puddefoot – When Falkirk FC broke the World Transfer Record
 Puddefoot, Sidney at TheCelticWiki.com (details of a charity match Puddefoot played against West Ham)

1894 births
1972 deaths
Footballers from Bow, London
English footballers
England international footballers
England wartime international footballers
English cricketers
Essex cricketers
Association football forwards
West Ham United F.C. players
British Army personnel of World War I
Falkirk F.C. wartime guest players
Falkirk F.C. players
Blackburn Rovers F.C. players
Fenerbahçe football managers
Galatasaray S.K. (football) managers
Scottish Football League players
English Football League players
English Football League representative players
English football managers
English expatriate football managers
Northampton Town F.C. managers
Expatriate football managers in Turkey
Southend United F.C. non-playing staff
Deaths from pneumonia in England
Association football coaches
English expatriate sportspeople in Turkey
FA Cup Final players
Association football scouts